As of 2020, Hispanics and Latinos make up 18.7% of the total U.S. population (approximately 62 million out of a total of around 330 million). The state with the largest percentage of Hispanics and Latinos is New Mexico at 47.7%. The state with the largest Hispanic and Latino population overall is California with 15.6 million Hispanics and Latinos. Hispanics are the largest racial or ethnic group in both states and will become the largest in Texas in the early 2020s.

The following are lists of the Hispanic and Latino population per state in the United States.

2000–20 US Census results

In the 2010s, Hispanic population growth slowed down due to a massive decline in immigration from Latin America as well as a large decline in birth rates; Asians became the fastest growing demographic group. A much higher proportion of Hispanics choose mixed race rather than white in the 2020 census as compared to previous censuses. Hispanics accounted for 51.1% of population growth between 2010-2020 and 56% between 2000-2010. 

The proportion of the population which is Hispanic increased at least slightly in every state. Growth was slowest in the states with large historical Mexican American and Hispano populations including New Mexico, California, Arizona, Texas and Colorado where relative growth in population proportion was 5% or less compared to 15% nationally. Growth was highest in states which historically lacked a Hispanic population continuing the trend of intrastate migration for mostly lower wage jobs in the 21st century by Hispanics. These states include North Dakota, Tennessee, Vermont and Maine where relative growth in population proportion was over 50%. Pennsylvania, with a Hispanic population of 0.1% in 1940, saw a greater numeric increase in the Hispanic population than Arizona; with a Hispanic population of 20.4% in 1940.

U.S. states by Mexican American population

U.S. states by Puerto Rican population

Historic Hispanic/Latino population (1910-2020)

See also 
 Mexican migration
 Demographics of Hispanic and Latino Americans
 Illegal immigrant population of the United States
 Christianity among Hispanic and Latino Americans

Cities and neighborhoods:
 List of U.S. cities with large Hispanic and Latino populations
 List of U.S. cities by Spanish-speaking population
 List of California communities with Hispanic- or Latino-majority populations in the 2010 census

Notes

References

Hispanic and Latino
Hispanic and Latino demographics in the United States
Hispanic and Latino